President Khama may refer to:
Seretse Khama (1921–1980), the first President of Botswana, in office from 1966 to 1980
Ian Khama (born 1953), first-born son of Seretse and Ruth Williams Khama and President of Botswana from 2008 to 2018